Barohiya is a village in Maharajganj District of Uttar Pradesh.

Villages in Maharajganj district